Ju was an ancient Chinese city that existed during the Warring States period, and was located in what is today Ju County, Rizhao Prefecture, Shandong.

The State of Ju was originally a vassal state of the Zhou Dynasty during the Spring and Autumn period. The state eventually fell to the State of Qi, and became a city of Qi.

In 284 BC, the State of Yan attacked the State of Qi with forces commanded by Yue Yi, and managed to corner Qi within the city of Ju, the state's final stronghold. Although Qi lost a significant portion of territory, they were able to successfully counterattack against Yan under the leadership of Tian Dan and retake its lost territory within five years.

The idiom 毋忘在莒 "don't forget what happened in Ju" has two allusions with differing meanings, one of which refers to Qi's successful counterattack against Yan from the city of Ju, and is used to represent a retaking of one's homeland. The idiom was used by the Chiang Kai-shek-led Republic of China government after relocating to Taiwan in its effort to retake mainland China.

See also
Wu-Wang-Zai-Ju Inscribed Rock

References
Liu Wenyan and Zhang Xiaosheng, Zhongguo gu dai zhan zheng tong lan, 知書房出版集團, page 112
勞榦, (2006). 古代中國的歷史與文化, 聯經出版, page 74

History of ancient China
Cities in Shandong
Ju County
History of Shandong